The Medora Musical is a musical revue produced each summer at the open-air Burning Hills Amphitheater near Medora, North Dakota. The musical is a look back at the "Wild West" days of the region and includes references to Theodore Roosevelt, who spent time in western North Dakota, including in the nearby Theodore Roosevelt National Park.

The musical premiered at the amphitheater in the summer of 1965 and is the successor to earlier shows about Roosevelt.

History
The Burning Hills Amphitheater was built in 1958 one mile west of Medora, for the production of Old Four-Eyes, to help celebrate Theodore Roosevelt's 100th birthday. Thirty of the thirty-three performances were sold out.

Due to waning interest in the following years after its first season Old Four-Eyes was closed in 1964. The show was replaced by Teddy Roosevelt Rides Again for the 1963 and 1964 seasons. In 1965 businessman Harold Schafer purchased the amphitheater. After undergoing some renovations, including expanding the stage and the seating area, the Medora Musical opened.

In 1986 the Schafer family and the Gold Seal company donated their share in Medora to the Theodore Roosevelt Medora Foundation (TRMF). The foundation maintains the amphitheater and historical properties and other projects.  In 1991, the amphitheatre received a $4.1 million facelift which enlarged the seating to 2,863, built new stage, installed escalators, and a wheelchair ramp.  The new Burning Hills Amphitheater was completed in 1992 with the bolting in of the new seats. Additional construction was completed in 1997.  In 2005 another renovation was made to the sets and the stage.  Curt Wollan is the musical's longtime director and executive producer.

Burning Hills Amphitheater 
The amphitheater was carved out of the side of the badlands in Burning Gulch by local volunteers, cast members and boys from the Home on the Range Ranch.  The original theater seated between 1,000, and 1,200 people.  It was constructed of wooden benches on the hillside with rustic buildings that formed a set around the stage. The natural acoustics of the hillside meant that no sound system would be needed.

Former show names
Ol’ Four Eyes 1958-1962
Teddy Roosevelt Rides Again 1963, 1964
Medora Musical 1965–present

See also
 List of contemporary amphitheatres

External links
Medora Musical website
North Dakota tourism website

References

Music of North Dakota
1965 musicals
Amphitheaters in the United States
Tourist attractions in Billings County, North Dakota
Theatre in North Dakota